Pisania rosadoi is a species of sea snail, a marine gastropod mollusk in the family Pisaniidae.

Description

Distribution

References

 Bozzetti L. & Ferrario M. (2005). Three new species and a new subspecies from the South-Western Indian Ocean (Gastropoda: Prosobranchia: Turbinidae, Tonnidae, Buccinidae, Conidae). Visaya. 1(4): 51-58

External links

Pisaniidae
Gastropods described in 2005